Polyanthina is a genus of flowering plants in the tribe Eupatorieae within the family Asteraceae.

Species
The only known species is Polyanthina nemorosa, native to South and Central America (Panama, Costa Rica, Venezuela, Colombia, Ecuador, and Peru).

References

Eupatorieae
Monotypic Asteraceae genera
Flora of South America
Flora of Central America